B.C. Rich is an American brand of acoustic and electric guitars and bass guitars founded by Bernardo Chavez Rico in 1969.

History 
The company started making electric guitars in the 1970s. In the following decade B.C. Rich gained a broad exposure with the popularity of heavy metal and has often been linked to that music scene. High-end B.C. Rich instruments were custom-made in the US by Ron Estrada whereas the mid- and low-end models were produced in different countries in Asia. The company briefly switched owners in the 1990s before being acquired in the 2000s by Hanser Music Group, a distribution company based in Hebron, Kentucky. B.C Rich was later licensed to Praxis Musical based in Orange, California until 2018.

On July 21, 2019, the official B.C. Rich Facebook page announced a change in ownership. The new management has reintroduced BC legacy models such as the IronBird and Stealth.

Design and types

Initially the pickups were Gibson, rewired as four-conductor and potted. Later, Guild pickups were rewired the same way.

In 1974–1975, some custom guitar models, and from 1975 to 1982, many production bass guitars were fitted with adjustable-pole humbucker pickups, designed by Sergio Zuñica.

In 1975, DiMarzio agreed to build wax-potted, four-conductor pickups for B.C. Rich, and these were used until B.C. Rich began designing their own in the late 1980s. Early in the 1970s, Neal Moser was brought on board to design and supervise the electronics. His contribution was a wiring harness with coil taps, a phase switch, a Varitone, and a defeatable active preamp (or two in some models). This electronics package continues to this day on higher-end models.

Beginning in 1976, serial numbers began as a stamped 6 digit number starting with the year and ending with the number of production (600037 would be the 37th guitar built in 1976). The numbers became increasingly inaccurate through the 1980s, ending up about 4 years behind, due to the quantity of guitars produced in a year often exceeding 1000 (i.e. a 88xxx serial number guitar would have been built in 1984). After the company was purchased by Class Axe in 1989 production of the hand-made, neck-through models was halted for several years, although GMW (Neal Moser) supplied some stock made from rejected then repaired bodies hand built through the years. After Class Axe took over there were a number of different serial schemes designated for the American, Asian and Bolt-on guitars.

Seagull
The Seagull shape was uncomfortable for some to play due to the sharp upper point, and the sharp lower point that dug into the leg sitting down. It was redesigned several times to include a smoother lower point, and a Junior version with simpler electronics, then a pointless version which is quite rare. Finally it morphed into the Eagle shape with no sharp points.

Stealth
The Stealth was designed by Rick Derringer. Chuck Schuldiner owned several B.C. Rich guitars. In 2008, B.C. Rich released the Chuck Schuldiner Tribute Stealth, as well as a handcrafted version, with a portion of the proceeds going directly to Schuldiner's family. In 2021, B.C. Rich announced the Chuck Schuldiner Stealth.

Eagle
This model was made popular by Brad Whitford of Aerosmith and Neil Giraldo, who played his Eagle on some of the early Pat Benatar albums and videos.

Mockingbird

The Mockingbird model was designed by Johnny "Go-Go" Kessel. It was made popular by Joe Perry of Aerosmith and Lita Ford of The Runaways. The Mockingbird experienced a resurgence in the early 1990s through Guns N' Roses lead guitarist Slash after he played one on the Use Your Illusion world tour. David Ellefson of Megadeth played a Mockingbird bass in first years of the band.

The B.C. Rich ("Bich")
The B.C. Rich "Bich" ten-string guitar was developed by Neal Moser, a sub-contractor for Bernie Rico (B.C. Rich) from 1974 to 1985. During his time with B.C. Rich, Moser conceived, designed, and built the first prototype. He then licensed the design to B.C. Rich. The guitar was introduced as the "Rich Bich" at the 1978 NAMM Show as a custom-order model.

The original Bich is a six-course instrument, but with four two-string courses. The top E and B strings are strung as unison pairs, and the G and D strings as pairs with a principal and octave string, in the manner of the top four courses of a twelve-string guitar. The A and lower E strings are single-string courses. This unusual stringing was meant to obtain the brightness of the twelve-string guitar, while allowing higher levels of distortion before the sound became muddy.

The Bich had a conventional six-string headstock for the principal strings, with the four extra strings tuned by machine heads positioned in the body, past the tailpiece, with a large angled notch allowing access to the tuners. This radical body shape also countered the common tendency of coursed electric guitars to be head-heavy due to the weight of the extra machine heads.

The design was moderately successful, but many players bought it for the body shape alone, and removed the extra strings. B.C. Rich eventually released 6-string and 6/12-string double neck models of the Bich body shape. All Bich variants are hardtail guitars with through body necks and two humbucking pickups. The ten-string models differ from each other in finish and control details.

A lawsuit between Neal Moser and HHI Holdings Inc./B.C. Rich was settled, giving Moser Custom Guitars and HHI/B.C. Rich the right to produce their own versions of the Bich ten- and six-string guitars, with Neal Moser retaining ownership of the original body templates. The Moser Custom Shop "Moser 10" and the BC Rich Bich "PMS" models are the closest representations of the original pre-1985 "Rich Bich" body design. The "Moser 10" models have an "M" inlay on the headstock, compared to the HHI/BC Rich "R" headstock inlay.

Notable users of the ten-string Bich include Joe Perry (Aerosmith), Dave Mustaine (Megadeth), Chris Poland, also of Megadeth, Manny Charlton (Nazareth), and George Kooymans (Golden Earring).

BC Rich Bich "PMS" 10 String Prototype
To celebrate the 25th-anniversary release of the "Rich Bich" 10-string guitar, HHI/BC Rich contracted the original BC Rich luthiers Neal Moser and Sal Gonzales to produce 25 true hand-built reproductions of the original prototype to the Bich 10-string model. These hand-carved guitars were built from Neal Moser's original 1978 body templates, using the same exotic woods (black African walnut, maple and Brazilian rosewood) as the original prototype model.

Due to contract issues between Neal Moser and Hanser Holdings, only 16 of the PMS models were produced. These have become highly prized by BC Rich collectors due to the limited production number. The original prototype is currently owned by Dan Lawrence.

Dave Mustaine (Megadeth) was known to use the ten-string variant of the Bich throughout the early 1980s, although with the four additional strings removed. The guitar was reportedly pawned, without Mustaine's knowledge, by Megadeth lead guitarist Chris Poland, which led to his dismissal. The current whereabouts of the guitar are unknown.

Warlock

The introduction of the Warlock model in 1981 helped push B.C. Rich into the heavy metal music genre. Notable early players included Mick Mars and Nikki Sixx of Mötley Crüe, Lita Ford, Paul Stanley of KISS (featuring a broken mirror top), Randy Jackson (Zebra), Craig Goldy of Dio and Giuffria, and a young pre-Les Paul playing Slash. Its popularity continues with players such as Slayer guitarist Kerry King. While Slipknot was gaining in popularity (early 2000's), guitarist Mick Thomson was well known for his signature red/black and black/white Warlocks with "HATE" fretboard inlays.

A variation on the Warlock design, called the "Warbeast" has also been produced. The Warbeast features a more heavily bevelled body, longer body horns as well as an additional horn in the upper middle section. The Warbeast was also produced exclusively with the "3-in-line" headstock design, and with Floyd Rose bridges included as standard, except on the cheapest models.

Ironbird

Designed by Joey Rico in 1983, the Ironbird gained some popularity amongst heavy metal guitarists, including Trey Azagthoth of Morbid Angel. The original model had a pointed reverse headstock, whereas the 21st Century version has a regular pointed headstock.

Acrylic Series 
These guitars are made completely of acrylic and their bodies are transparent, making the electronics inside visible. The original run of the acrylic models featured a standard bolt-on maple neck with wood headstock, but later models featured an acrylic headstock, matching the color of the body and making the overall appearance of the guitar more attractive. Acrylic is more dense than most woods (specific gravity of acrylic is 1.18 g/cm3 while that of lignum vitae, contender for the most dense type of wood, is approximately 1.23 g/cm3) which makes the guitar heavier.

Other features 
Like Rickenbacker and Jackson, B.C. Rich used a "neck-through" body design in many of their instruments. In 2006, they introduced the IT (Invisibolt Technology) series, which combines elements of bolt-on and neck-through designs: The neck is bolted inside the body to make the guitar look much like a "neck-through", but the neck joint is still visible. B.C. Rich also pioneered the heel-less joint.

Some models used custom battery-powered active electronics – pickups and tone controls inside the guitar. These electronics were originally designed by Neal Moser, who had been helping with bone crafted parts and many set ups in the custom shop. He added the feet on winged guitars like the Rich Bich, which was one of his designs.

B.C. Rich guitars come in a variety of shapes, ranging from more conventional styles (e.g., the Telecaster-styled Blaster) to unusual styles such as the Fat Bob, which has a body in the shape of a Harley-Davidson gas tank.

Most recently Hate eternal and Cannibal Corpse Guitarist Erik Rutan has been playing a variety of Ironbird Guitars. He is now a BC Rich Signature Artist.

See also
 List of B.C. Rich guitars

References

External links 

 

B.C. Rich electric guitars
Guitar manufacturing companies of the United States
Electric bass guitars by manufacturer
Manufacturing companies based in Tennessee